Alan Hume,  (16 October 1924 – 13 July 2010) was an English cinematographer.

Life and career
Hume arrived at Denham Film Studios in 1942, and worked for Cineguild Productions during the late 1940s. His early credits, prior to being called up to the Royal Navy and Fleet Air Arm during the Second World War, included Oliver and The First of the Few (1942). Post-war, he served as a camera operator for Great Expectations (1946), Madeleine (1950) and The End of the Affair (1955). During the 1960s, he was director of photography for the successful Carry On comedy films, beginning with 1961's Carry On Regardless; eventually, Hume alternated with Ernest Steward in the position of the series' regular director of photography.

Hume's other cinematographic work during the 1960s included the horror films The Kiss of the Vampire (1962, for Hammer Films) and Dr. Terror's House of Horrors (1965, for Amicus Productions). Among his later films were Checkered Flag or Crash (1977), For Your Eyes Only (1981), Return of the Jedi (1983), Octopussy (1983), A View to a Kill (1985), Runaway Train (1985), A Fish Called Wanda (1988) and Shirley Valentine (1989).

Personal life and death 
Hume had four children, all of whom have followed him into the film industry.

One of his sons, Lindsay, died in a road traffic accident when in his late teens. His other two sons and daughter Pauline continued working in the film industry.

He died on 13 July 2010 in Chalfont St Giles, England, at age 85, and was survived by his wife and 3 children.

References

External links
 
 
 Obituary in The Guardian
 Obituary in The Independent

1924 births
2010 deaths
English cinematographers
Fleet Air Arm personnel of World War II
Film people from London
Royal Navy personnel of World War II
Place of death missing